The 1948 Idaho Vandals football team represented the University of Idaho in the 1948 college football season. The Vandals were led by second-year head coach Dixie Howell and were members of the  Pacific Coast Conference. Home games were played on campus at Neale Stadium in Moscow, with one game in Boise at Public School Field.

Idaho was  overall and won one of their six PCC games; future schedules had fewer conference matchups. A night game was played in late September in Salt Lake City, a loss to Utah.

The Vandals' losing streak in the Battle of the Palouse with neighbor Washington State reached twenty games, with a  loss in Pullman on October 30. Idaho tied the Cougars two years later, but the winless streak continued 

In the rivalry game with Montana in Moscow a week earlier, Idaho won  to regain the Little Brown Stein. Montana won it back two years later with a one-point  then the Vandals won eight straight, through 1959.

Schedule

All-conference
No Vandals were named to the All-Coast team; honorable mention were tackles Carl Kiilsgaard and Will Overgaard, guard Wilbur Ruleman, and back John Brogan.

NFL Draft
Two juniors from the 1948 Vandals were selected in the 1950 NFL Draft:

Three sophomores were selected in the 1951 NFL Draft:

List of Idaho Vandals in the NFL Draft

References

External links
Gem of the Mountains: 1949 University of Idaho yearbook – 1948 football season
Go Mighty Vandals – 1948 football season
Official game program: Idaho at Washington State –  October 30, 1948
Idaho Argonaut – student newspaper – 1948 editions

Idaho
Idaho Vandals football seasons
Idaho Vandals football